Parliamentary elections were held in Serbia on 21 January 2007 to elect members of the National Assembly. The first session of the new National Assembly of the Republic of Serbia was held on 14 February 2007. The elections enabled the coalition of DS; DSS & G17+ to continue.

Electoral system
The d'Hondt method was used to distribute parliamentary mandates following the election. Parties and coalitions had 10 days following the announcement of the final results to decide which candidates will take their allotted seats in parliament. Parties then had three months to negotiate a government.

Parties registering as ethnic minority parties (options 8, 10, 14, 17, 19 and 20) did not need to surpass the 5% threshold to gain seats in the parliament, but instead needed to pass a natural threshold at 0.4%. For the first time in a decade, Albanian parties from the Preševo Valley participated in the elections, but Kosovo Albanian parties continued their boycott of Serbian elections.

6,652,105 voters were eligible to vote, an increase of 14,000 voters when compared to the constitutional referendum held a few months before. 31,370 of the eligible voters were living abroad, and 7,082 were in prison.

Electoral lists
Twenty party lists registered with the electoral commission before the deadline of 5 January 2007:

Campaign

Slogans
The parties' campaign slogans for the 2007 election:

The change figure for the Democratic Party of Serbia/New Serbia list is in comparison to the 2003 result for the Democratic Party of Serbia; New Serbia was aligned to the Serbian Renewal Movement in 2003. The grouping headed by the Liberal Democratic Party is new: the Liberal Democratic Party split off from the Democratic Party in 2005; Civic Alliance of Serbia and the Social Democratic Union were part of the Democratic Party list in 2003; and the League of Social Democrats of Vojvodina were in a list with the Alliance of Vojvodina Hungarians in 2003. The Coalition List for Sandžak previously stood as part of the Democratic Party list.

Results
The Republican Electoral Commission finally published the final results after the repetition of voting in several places:

Reactions
Dutch foreign minister Ben Bot congratulated Boris Tadić with the result, stating "the fact that Mr. Tadić has doubled his position in the parliament is of great importance, since it means that the Serbian people value a "pro-European" course". 
EU foreign policy chief Javier Solana stated "The majority voted for forces that are democratic and pro-European", continuing "I hope very much there will be a speedy formation of a government that will be on the line of "pro-European" forces."
German Foreign Minister Frank-Walter Steinmeier said "The radicals got most votes but nevertheless two thirds of the seats in parliament will go to "democratic" forces."
Michael C. Polt, US ambassador to Serbia, congratulated Serbian people on results, stating that "the United States looks forward to continuing to work with you and your leadership as your country fulfills the promise of October 2000".
Jean Asselborn, Deputy Prime Minister of Luxembourg, stated that EU should show support to Serbia, after "democratic" forces won the elections, as NATO did when Serbia was invited to join "Partnership for Peace" despite not cooperating with the ICTY.
Sergey Baburin, Vice-president of the Russian State Duma stated “the parties to form the government will soon hear Martti Ahtisaari’s recommendations for the settlement of the Kosovo issue, and I deem their position unenviable. In my opinion, parties are making a big mistake by not letting Serbian Radicals partake in the government. Patriotic parties in Serbia are getting potentially stronger”.

References

External links
Republican Electoral Commission of the Republic of Serbia

Elections in Serbia
Serbia
Parliamentary election
Serbia
2007 elections in Serbia